Breese is a city in Clinton County, Illinois, United States. Breese is the most populous city completely within Clinton County. As of the 2020 census, the population was 4,641, the majority of whom are of German ancestry. Breese is part of the Metro-East region of the Greater St. Louis metropolitan area.

History
The town is named after Sidney Breese, a United States Senator and a contemporary of President Abraham Lincoln. Breese was founded in 1855.

Even though the area around Breese, Illinois was first settled in 1816, it was not until 1835 that Germans came to the town to farm because of the flat fertile land there. Twenty years after the Germans' first immigration, the Mississippi and Ohio Railroad was completed. The early pioneers were enthralled by the thought of transportation by railroad. The Chicago-based company Sanger Kamp & Co. bought 80 acres of land near the railroad. Twenty-four acres were laid out with the railroad splitting the original town with some acres on the north side and south side creating Breese Township, February 3, 1855.

Late in 1855, forty Catholic immigrants, wanting to fulfill their religious needs, had the idea of constructing a church. Their desires were realized when two years later the Sanger Kamp & Co. gave half of one of its  to the Catholics’ project. By December 1869, St. Dominic's Catholic Church was completed. Breese was first recognized as a town on April 11, 1871, and later became a village on September 23, 1876. As a result, the construction of the village hall had begun. This project was completed in 1885. Seven years later a volunteer fire department was organized. The ever-growing population was then acknowledged as a city on January 19,
1905. The mayor of this new city was Henry Hummert.

Realizing that Breese would need some improvements, the mayor authorized the construction of an electric light plant that was completed in 1906. The streets of Breese were also topped with road oil in 1911. The next year improvements to the city's water works facility were also made.

However, things took a turn for the worse when, in 1914, a scarlet fever swept the community and its surrounding area and forced all the schools to close. Only four years later, still in the wake of the scarlet fever, the flu epidemic spread through the area.

1906 Coal mine disaster
On December 24, 1906, Six miners were killed and one injured when a mine cage collapsed and fell down the shaft in a mine owned and operated by The Breese and Trenton Coal Company. The miners killed included Henry Middeke, Herman Scheleper, Walter Schaffner, August Foppe, Frank Zehrer, and Hermann Holtmann. The only one injured was mine manager William Fritz. An investigation concluded that improper filling of an old air shaft caused a dirt slide leading to the collapse. The Breese and Trenton Coal Company was found guilty of negligence.

Geography

Demographics

As of the 2020 census there were 4,641 people, 1,861 households, and 1,116 families residing in the city. The racial makeup of the city was 93.30% White, 0.24% African American, 0.13% Native American, 0.32% Asian, 2.84% from other races, and 3.17% from two or more races. Hispanic or Latino of any race were 4.37% of the population.

There were 1,861 households, out of which 46.37% had children under the age of 18 living with them, 50.24% were married couples living together, 6.39% had a female householder with no husband present, and 40.03% were non-families. 33.91% of all households were made up of individuals, and 18.27% had someone living alone who was 65 years of age or older. The average household size was 2.84 and the average family size was 2.19.

The city's age distribution consisted of 21.0% under the age of 18, 6.9% from 18 to 24, 26.9% from 25 to 44, 26.6% from 45 to 64, and 18.6% who were 65 years of age or older. The median age was 39.9 years. For every 100 females, there were 88.9 males. For every 100 females age 18 and over, there were 77.4 males.

The median income for a household in the city was $70,411, and the median income for a family was $90,208. Males had a median income of $44,779 versus $26,833 for females. The per capita income for the city was $43,197. About 1.2% of families and 4.9% of the population were below the poverty line, including 0.0% of those under age 18 and 8.2% of those age 65 or over.

Schools
Public schools:
District 12 Grade School (Breese, Illinois)
Central Community High School - Formed as a consolidation of the Breese and Aviston high schools in 1971

Private schools:
Mater Dei High School (Breese, Illinois)
All Saints Academy Grade School (Breese, Illinois)

Notable people

Jake Odorizzi, pitcher for the Atlanta Braves; born in Breese
Josh Thole, former catcher for the New York Mets and Toronto Blue Jays; born in Breese
Tom Timmermann, former pitcher for the Detroit Tigers and Cleveland Indians; born in Breese

References

External links
Official Website

Cities in Illinois
Cities in Clinton County, Illinois
Populated places established in 1855
1855 establishments in Illinois